B-260 Chita was a Project 877  of the Russian Navy in service from 1981 to 2013, which sank in 2019 while being towed for dismantling.

Description 
Chita was a diesel-electric submarine with a surfaced displacement of 2,300 tons and submerged displacement of 3,950 tons. It had a crew of 52 and operated six  torpedo tubes.

History 
Construction began on the submarine on 22 February 1981, when it was laid down at Leninsky Komsomol Shipyard in Komsomolsk-on-Amur as B-260. It was launched on 23 August and was commissioned on 30 December. It did not receive the name Chita until 19 March 2006, when it was sponsored by the city administration of Chita. While in service, Chita was assigned to the Pacific Fleet, and the ship was decommissioned and laid up in 2013.

In November 2019, Chita was handed over to the company JSC MPZ Askona to be broken up and dismantled. On 11 December, the submarine was being towed by the tug Lazurit from Vladivostok to the dismantling yard in Nakhodka while in poor weather conditions. During the transit, while in the Sea of Japan, the stern of the submarine sank and rested on the seafloor. The tug disconnected and anchored nearby, and since Chita was unmanned and carried no fuel, there were no casualties in the incident. It was stated that the submarine was to be refloated in order to continue to the dismantling yard.

References 

1981 ships
Maritime incidents in 2019
Kilo-class submarines